Tufang may refer to:
Taqanak, city in Chaharmahal and Bakhtiari Province, Iran
Tufang, Changting County (涂坊镇), town in Changting County, Fujian, China